Another Me is the debut extended play by South Korean singer, Kim Sung-kyu. It was released on November 19, 2012 by Woollim Entertainment. Kim Sungkyu releasing pre-release track "Shine" on November 7 before this album release on November 19.

Although with a short promotion, the album was well received and became the top selling physical album for the month of November with 62,958 copies sold. More than half of the album sales were from international fans.

Track listing

Chart

Album chart

Sales and certifications

References

2012 EPs
EPs by South Korean artists
Woollim Entertainment EPs